This is a list of Bien de Interés Cultural landmarks in Navarre, Spain.

 Cámara de los Comptos
 Ex-monastery of Santa María de la Oliva
 Collegiate church of Santa María (Tudela)
 Church of Santa María la Real, Sangüesa
 San Esteban de Deyo

References 

 
Navarre